This is a list of the bird species recorded in Morocco. The avifauna of Morocco include a total of 542 species. Three of them have been introduced by humans. 

This list's taxonomic treatment (designation and sequence of orders, families and species) and nomenclature (English and scientific names) are those of The Clements Checklist of Birds of the World, 2022 edition.

The following tags have been used to highlight several categories of occurrence.

(A) Accidental - a species that only rarely occurs in Morocco; records of these species require formal acceptance by the Commission d’Homologation Marocaine (Moroccan Rare Birds Committee)
(I) Introduced - a species introduced to Morocco as a consequence, direct or indirect, of human actions, and has become established
(Ex) Extirpated - a species that no longer occurs in Morocco although populations exist elsewhere

Ostriches
Order: StruthioniformesFamily: Struthionidae

The ostriches are a flightless birds native to Africa. They are the largest living species of bird and are distinctive in appearance, with a long neck and legs and the ability to run at high speeds. This species was extirpated from Morocco some time before 1990; a re-introduction programme for the North African ostrich is in progress.

Common ostrich, Struthio camelus
North African ostrich, Struthio camelus camelus reintroduced

Ducks, geese, and waterfowl
Order: AnseriformesFamily: Anatidae

Anatidae includes the ducks and most duck-like waterfowl such as swans and geese.

Fulvous whistling-duck, Dendrocygna bicolor (A)
Snow goose, Anser caerulescens (A)
Graylag goose, Anser anser
Greater white-fronted goose, Anser albifrons (A)
Taiga bean-goose, Anser fabalis (A)
Bar-headed goose, Anser indicus (A)
Brant, Branta bernicla (A)
Barnacle goose, Branta leucopsis (A)
Mute swan, Cygnus olor (A)
Whooper swan, Cygnus cygnus (A)
Egyptian goose, Alopochen aegyptiacus (A)
Ruddy shelduck, Tadorna ferruginea
Common shelduck, Tadorna tadorna
Spur-winged goose, Plectropterus gambensis (A)
Mandarin duck, Aix galericulata (I)
Garganey, Spatula querquedula
Blue-winged teal, Spatula discors (A)
Cinnamon teal, Spatula cyanoptera (A)
Cape shoveler, Spatula smithii (A)
Northern shoveler, Spatula clypeata
Gadwall, Mareca strepera
Eurasian wigeon, Mareca penelope
American wigeon, Mareca americana (A)
Mallard, Anas platyrhynchos
Northern pintail, Anas acuta
Green-winged teal, Anas crecca
Marbled teal, Marmaronetta angustirostris
Southern pochard, Netta erythrophtalma (A)
Red-crested pochard, Netta rufina
Common pochard, Aythya ferina
Ring-necked duck, Aythya collaris (A)
Ferruginous duck, Aythya nyroca
Tufted duck, Aythya fuligula
Greater scaup, Aythya marila (A)
Lesser scaup, Aythya affinis (A)]
Common eider, Somateria mollissima (A) 
Velvet scoter, Melanitta fusca (A)
Common scoter, Melanitta nigra
Long-tailed duck, Clangula hyemalis (A)
Common goldeneye, Bucephala clangula (A)
Smew, Mergellus albellus (A)
Common merganser, Mergus merganser (A)
Red-breasted merganser, Mergus serrator
Ruddy duck, Oxyura jamaicensis (I)
White-headed duck, Oxyura leucocephala

Guineafowl
Order: GalliformesFamily: Numididae

Guineafowl are a group of African birds that resemble partridges, but with featherless heads and spangled grey plumage.

Helmeted guineafowl, Numida meleagris reintroduced

Pheasant, grouse, and allies
Order: GalliformesFamily: Phasianidae

Phasianidae are a family of terrestrial birds which consists of quails, partridges, francolins and pheasants. In general, they are plump (although they vary in size) and have broad, relatively short wings.

Rock ptarmigan, Lagopus muta (A)
Ring-necked pheasant, Phasianus colchicus (I)
Common quail, Coturnix coturnix
Barbary partridge, Alectoris barbara
Double-spurred francolin, Pternistis bicalcaratus

Flamingos
Order: PhoenicopteriformesFamily: Phoenicopteridae

Greater flamingo, Phoenicopterus roseus
Lesser flamingo, Phoeniconaias minor (A)

Grebes
Order: PodicipediformesFamily: Podicipedidae

Grebes are small to medium-large freshwater diving birds.

Little grebe, Tachybaptus ruficollis
Horned grebe, Podiceps auritus (A)
Red-necked grebe, Podiceps grisegena (A)
Great crested grebe, Podiceps cristatus
Eared grebe, Podiceps nigricollis

Pigeons and doves
Order: ColumbiformesFamily: Columbidae

Pigeons and doves are stout-bodied birds with short necks and short slender bills with a fleshy cere.

Rock pigeon, Columba livia
Stock dove, Columba oenas
Trocaz pigeon, Columba trocaz (A)
Common wood-pigeon, Columba palumbus
European turtle-dove, Streptopelia turtur
Eurasian collared-dove, Streptopelia decaocto
African collared-dove, Streptopelia roseogrisea (A)
Laughing dove, Streptopelia senegalensis
Namaqua dove, Oena capensis (A)

Sandgrouse
Order: PterocliformesFamily: Pteroclidae

Sandgrouse have small, pigeon-like, heads and necks, but sturdy compact bodies.

Pin-tailed sandgrouse, Pterocles alchata
Spotted sandgrouse, Pterocles senegallus
Black-bellied sandgrouse, Pterocles orientalis
Crowned sandgrouse, Pterocles coronatus
Lichtenstein's sandgrouse, Pterocles lichtensteinii

Bustards
Order: OtidiformesFamily: Otididae

Bustards are large terrestrial birds mainly associated with dry open country and steppes in the Old World. The Arabian bustard has been extirpated from Morocco since about 1985 and the houbara bustard is close to being extirpated.

Great bustard, Otis tarda
Arabian bustard, Ardeotis arabs (Ex?)
Houbara bustard, Chlamydotis undulata
Little bustard, Tetrax tetrax

Cuckoos
Order: CuculiformesFamily: Cuculidae

The cuckoos are birds are of variable size with slender bodies, long tails, and strong legs.

Great spotted cuckoo, Clamator glandarius
Yellow-billed cuckoo, Coccyzus americanus (A)
Common cuckoo, Cuculus canorus

Nightjars and allies
Order: CaprimulgiformesFamily: Caprimulgidae

Nightjars are medium-sized nocturnal birds with long wings, short legs, and very short bills.

Red-necked nightjar, Caprimulgus ruficollis
Eurasian nightjar, Caprimulgus europaeus
Egyptian nightjar, Caprimulgus aegyptius
Nubian nightjar, Caprimulgus nubicus (A)
Golden nightjar, Caprimulgus eximius (A)

Swifts
Order: CaprimulgiformesFamily: Apodidae

Swifts are small birds which spend the majority of their lives flying.

Chimney swift, Chaetura pelagica (A)
Alpine swift, Apus melba
Common swift, Apus apus
Plain swift, Apus unicolor (A)
Pallid swift, Apus pallidus
Little swift, Apus affinis
White-rumped swift, Apus caffer

Rails, gallinules, and coots

Order: GruiformesFamily: Rallidae

Rallidae is a large family of small to medium-sized birds which includes the rails, crakes, coots, and gallinules.

Water rail, Rallus aquaticus
Corn crake, Crex crex
African crake, Crex egregia (A)
Sora, Porzana carolina (A)
Spotted crake, Porzana porzana
Eurasian moorhen, Gallinula chloropus
Eurasian coot, Fulica atra
Red-knobbed coot, Fulica cristata
Allen's gallinule, Porphyrio alleni (A)
Purple gallinule, Porphyrio martinica (A)
Western swamphen, Porphyrio porphyrio
Striped crake, Amaurornis marginalis (A)
Little crake, Porzana parva
Baillon's crake, Porzana pusilla

Cranes
Order: GruiformesFamily: Gruidae

Cranes are large, long-legged, and long-necked birds. The demoiselle crane has been extirpated since 1985.

Demoiselle crane, Anthropoides virgo (Ex)
Common crane, Grus grus

Thick-knees
Order: CharadriiformesFamily: Burhinidae

The thick-knees are a group of waders found worldwide within the tropical zone, with some species also breeding in temperate Europe and Australia. Despite being classed as waders, most species have a preference for arid or semi-arid habitats.

Eurasian thick-knee, Burhinus oedicnemus
Senegal thick-knee, Burhinus senegalensis (A)

Stilts and avocets
Order: CharadriiformesFamily: Recurvirostridae

Recurvirostridae is a family of large wading birds which includes the avocets and stilts.

Black-winged stilt, Himantopus himantopus
Pied avocet, Recurvirostra avosetta

Oystercatchers
Order: CharadriiformesFamily: Haematopodidae

The oystercatchers are large and noisy plover-like birds, with strong bills used for smashing or prising open molluscs.

Eurasian oystercatcher, Haematopus ostralegus

Plovers and lapwings
Order: CharadriiformesFamily: Charadriidae

The family Charadriidae includes the plovers, dotterels, and lapwings. They are small to medium-sized birds with compact bodies, short thick necks, and long, usually pointed, wings.

Black-bellied plover, Pluvialis squatarola
European golden-plover, Pluvialis apricaria
American golden-plover, Pluvialis dominica (A)
Pacific golden-plover, Pluvialis fulva (A)
Northern lapwing, Vanellus vanellus
Sociable lapwing, Vanellus gregarius (A)
White-tailed lapwing, Vanellus leucurus (A)
Greater sand-plover, Charadrius leschenaultii (A)
Kittlitz's plover, Charadrius pecuarius (A)
Kentish plover, Charadrius alexandrinus
Common ringed plover, Charadrius hiaticula
Little ringed plover, Charadrius dubius
Eurasian dotterel, Charadrius morinellus

Painted-snipes
Order: CharadriiformesFamily: Rostratulidae

Painted-snipes are short-legged, long-billed birds similar in shape to the true snipes, but more brightly coloured.

Greater painted-snipe, Rostratula benghalensis (A)

Sandpipers and allies
Order: CharadriiformesFamily: Scolopacidae

Scolopacidae is a large diverse family of small to medium-sized waders including the sandpipers, curlews, godwits, shanks, woodcocks, snipes, dowitchers, and phalaropes. The majority of these species eat small invertebrates picked out of the mud or soil. Variation in length of legs and bills enables multiple species to feed in the same habitat, particularly on the coast, without direct competition for food.

Upland sandpiper, Bartramia longicauda (A)
Whimbrel, Numenius phaeopus
Slender-billed curlew, Numenius tenuirostris (Ex)
Eurasian curlew, Numenius arquata
Bar-tailed godwit, Limosa lapponica
Black-tailed godwit, Limosa limosa
Ruddy turnstone, Arenaria interpres
Great knot, Calidris tenuirostris (A)
Red knot, Calidris canutus
Ruff, Calidris pugnax
Broad-billed sandpiper, Calidris falcinellus (A)
Stilt sandpiper, Calidris himantopus (A)
Curlew sandpiper, Calidris ferruginea
Temminck's stint, Calidris temminckii
Sanderling, Calidris alba
Dunlin, Calidris alpina
Purple sandpiper, Calidris maritima (A)
Baird's sandpiper, Calidris bairdii (A)
Little stint, Calidris minuta
White-rumped sandpiper, Calidris fuscicollis (A)
Buff-breasted sandpiper, Calidris subruficollis (A)
Pectoral sandpiper, Calidris melanotos (A)
Semipalmated sandpiper, Calidris pusilla (A)
Long-billed dowitcher, Limnodromus scolopaceus (A)
Jack snipe, Lymnocryptes minimus
Eurasian woodcock, Scolopax rusticola
Great snipe, Gallinago media
Common snipe, Gallinago gallinago
Terek sandpiper, Xenus cinereus (A)
Wilson's phalarope, Phalaropus tricolor (A)
Red-necked phalarope, Phalaropus lobatus (A)
Red phalarope, Phalaropus fulicarius
Common sandpiper, Actitis hypoleucos
Spotted sandpiper, Actitis macularia (A)
Green sandpiper, Tringa ochropus
Spotted redshank, Tringa erythropus
Greater yellowlegs, Tringa melanoleuca (A)
Common greenshank, Tringa nebularia
Lesser yellowlegs, Tringa flavipes (A)
Marsh sandpiper, Tringa stagnatilis
Wood sandpiper, Tringa glareola
Common redshank, Tringa totanus

Buttonquail
Order: CharadriiformesFamily: Turnicidae

The buttonquails are small, drab, running birds which resemble the true quails. This species is close to being extirpated in Morocco.

Small buttonquail, Turnix sylvaticus

Pratincoles and coursers
Order: CharadriiformesFamily: Glareolidae

Glareolidae is a family of wading birds comprising the pratincoles, which have short legs, long pointed wings, and long forked tails, and the coursers, which have long legs, short wings, and long, pointed bills which curve downwards.

Cream-colored courser, Cursorius cursor
Collared pratincole, Glareola pratincola
Black-winged pratincole, Glareola nordmanni (A)

Skuas and jaegers
Order: CharadriiformesFamily: Stercorariidae

The family Stercorariidae are, in general, medium to large birds, typically with grey or brown plumage, often with white markings on the wings.

Great skua, Stercorarius skua
South Polar skua, Stercorarius maccormicki (A)
Pomarine jaeger, Stercorarius pomarinus
Parasitic jaeger, Stercorarius parasiticus
Long-tailed jaeger, Stercorarius longicaudus (A)

Auks, murres, and puffins
Order: CharadriiformesFamily: Alcidae

Alcidae live on the open sea, only deliberately coming ashore to nest.

Dovekie, Alle alle (A)
Common murre, Uria aalge (A)
Razorbill, Alca torda
Atlantic puffin, Fratercula arctica

Gulls, terns, and skimmers
Order: CharadriiformesFamily: Laridae

Laridae is a family of medium to large seabirds, the gulls, terns, and skimmers. Gulls are typically grey or white, often with black markings on the head or wings. They have stout, longish bills and webbed feet. Terns are a group of generally medium to large seabirds typically with grey or white plumage, often with black markings on the head. Skimmers are a small family of tropical tern-like birds.

Black-legged kittiwake, Rissa tridactyla
Sabine's gull, Xema sabini
Slender-billed gull, Chroicocephalus genei
Bonaparte's gull, Chroicocephalus philadelphia (A)
Gray-hooded gull, Chroicocephalus cirrocephalus (A)
Black-headed gull, Chroicocephalus ridibundus
Little gull, Hydrocoloeus minutus
Laughing gull, Leucophaeus atricilla (A)
Franklin's gull, Leucophaeus pipixcan (A)
Mediterranean gull, Ichthyaetus melanocephalus
Pallas's gull, Ichthyaetus ichthyaetus (A)
Audouin's gull, Ichthyaetus audouinii
Common gull, Larus canus
Ring-billed gull, Larus delawarensis (A)
Herring gull, Larus argentatus
Yellow-legged gull, Larus michahellis
Caspian gull, Larus cachinnans (A)
Iceland gull, Larus glaucoides (A)
Lesser black-backed gull, Larus fuscus
Glaucous-winged gull, Larus glaucescens (A)
Glaucous gull, Larus hyperboreus (A)
Great black-backed gull, Larus marinus
Kelp gull, Larus dominicanus (A)
Brown noddy, Anous stolidus (A)
Sooty tern, Onychoprion fuscata (A)
Bridled tern, Onychoprion anaethetus
Little tern, Sternula albifrons
Gull-billed tern, Gelochelidon nilotica
Caspian tern, Hydroprogne caspia
Black tern, Chlidonias niger
White-winged tern, Chlidonias leucopterus
Whiskered tern, Chlidonias hybrida
Roseate tern, Sterna dougallii
Common tern, Sterna hirundo
Arctic tern, Sterna paradisaea
Sandwich tern, Thalasseus sandvicensis
Lesser crested tern, Thalasseus bengalensis
West African crested tern, Thalasseus albididorsalis
African skimmer, Rynchops flavirostris (A)

Loons
Order: GaviiformesFamily: Gaviidae

Loons are a group of aquatic birds found in many parts of the Northern Hemisphere.

Yellow-billed loon, Gavia adamsii (A)
Red-throated loon, Gavia stellata (A)
Arctic loon, Gavia arctica (A)
Common loon, Gavia immer (A)

Tropicbirds
Order: PhaethontiformesFamily: Phaethontidae

Tropicbirds are slender white birds of tropical oceans, with exceptionally long central tail feathers. Their heads and long wings have black markings.

Red-billed tropicbird, Phaethon aethereus (A)

Albatrosses
Order: ProcellariiformesFamily: Diomedeidae

The albatrosses are among the largest of flying birds, and the great albatrosses from the genus Diomedea have the largest wingspans of any extant birds.

Black-browed albatross, Thalassarche melanophris (A)

Southern storm-petrels
Order: ProcellariiformesFamily: Oceanitidae

The storm-petrels are the smallest seabirds, relatives of the petrels, feeding on planktonic crustaceans and small fish picked from the surface, typically while hovering. The flight is fluttering and sometimes bat-like. Until 2018, this family's species were included with the other storm-petrels in family Hydrobatidae.

Wilson's storm-petrel, Oceanites oceanicus
White-faced storm-petrel, Pelagodroma marina (A)

Northern storm-petrels
Order: ProcellariiformesFamily: Hydrobatidae

Though the members of this family are similar in many respects to the southern storm-petrels, including their general appearance and habits, there are enough genetic differences to warrant their placement in a separate family.

European storm-petrel, Hydrobates pelagicus
Leach's storm-petrel, Hydrobates leucorhous
Band-rumped storm-petrel, Hydrobates castro (A)

Shearwaters and petrels
Order: ProcellariiformesFamily: Procellariidae

The procellariids are the main group of medium-sized "true petrels", characterised by united nostrils with medium septum and a long outer functional primary.

Northern fulmar, Fulmarus glacialis (A)
Zino's petrel, Pterodroma madeira (A)
Fea's petrel, Pterodroma feae
Black-capped petrel, Pterodroma hasitata (A)
Bulwer's petrel, Bulweria bulwerii (A)
Cory's shearwater, Calonectris diomedia
Cape Verde shearwater, Calonectris edwardsii (A)
Great shearwater, Ardenna gravis
Sooty shearwater, Ardenna griseus
Manx shearwater, Puffinus puffinus
Yelkouan shearwater, Puffinus yelkouan
Balearic shearwater, Puffinus mauretanicus
Barolo shearwater, Puffinus baroli (A)
Persian shearwater, Puffinus persicus

Storks
Order: CiconiiformesFamily: Ciconiidae

Storks are large, long-legged, long-necked wading birds with long, stout bills. Their nests can be large and may be reused for many years. Many species are migratory.

Black stork, Ciconia nigra
White stork, Ciconia ciconia
Marabou stork, Leptoptilos crumenifer (A)
Yellow-billed stork, Mycteria ibis (A)

Frigatebirds
Order: SuliformesFamily: Fregatidae

Frigatebirds are large seabirds usually found over tropical oceans. They are large, black-and-white, or completely black, with long wings and deeply forked tails. The males have colored inflatable throat pouches. They do not swim or walk and cannot take off from a flat surface. Having the largest wingspan-to-body-weight ratio of any bird, they are essentially aerial, able to stay aloft for more than a week.

Magnificent frigatebird, Fregata magnificens (A)

Boobies and gannets
Order: SuliformesFamily: Sulidae

The sulids comprise the gannets and boobies. Both groups are seabirds that plunge-dive for fish.

Masked booby, Sula dactylatra (A)
Brown booby, Sula leucogaster (A)
Northern gannet, Morus bassanus
Cape gannet, Morus capensis (A)

Anhingas
Order: SuliformesFamily: Anhingidae

Anhingas or darters are water birds with a distinctive long slender neck and bill.

African darter, Anhinga rufa (A)

Cormorants and shags
Order: SuliformesFamily: Phalacrocoracidae

Phalacrocoracidae is a family of medium to large fish-eating waterbirds.

Long-tailed cormorant, Microcarbo africanus (A)
Great cormorant, Phalacrocorax carbo
European shag, Gulosus aristotelis

Pelicans
Order: PelecaniformesFamily: Pelecanidae

Pelicans are large water birds with a distinctive pouch under their beak.

Great white pelican, Pelecanus onocrotalus (A)
Pink-backed pelican, Pelecanus rufescens (A)

Herons, egrets, and bitterns
Order: PelecaniformesFamily: Ardeidae

The family Ardeidae contains the bitterns, herons, and egrets. Herons and egrets are medium to large wading birds with long necks and legs. Bitterns tend to be shorter necked and more wary. Members of Ardeidae fly with their necks retracted, unlike other long-necked birds such as storks, ibises and spoonbills.

American bittern, Botaurus lentiginosus (A)
Great bittern, Botaurus stellaris
Little bittern, Ixobrychus minutus
Gray heron, Ardea cinerea
Purple heron, Ardea purpurea
Great egret, Ardea alba
Great blue heron, Ardea herodias (A)
Intermediate egret, Ardea intermedia (A)
Little egret, Egretta garzetta
Western reef-heron, Egretta gularis (A)
Cattle egret, Bubulcus ibis
Squacco heron, Ardeola ralloides
Striated heron, Butorides striata (A)
Black-crowned night-heron, Nycticorax nycticorax

Ibises and spoonbills
Order: PelecaniformesFamily: Threskiornithidae

Threskiornithidae is a family of large terrestrial and wading birds which includes the ibises and spoonbills.

Glossy ibis, Plegadis falcinellus
Northern bald ibis, Geronticus eremita
Eurasian spoonbill, Platalea leucorodia
African spoonbill, Platalea alba (A)

Osprey
Order: AccipitriformesFamily: Pandionidae

The family Pandionidae contains only one species, the osprey, a medium large bird of prey with a worldwide distribution.

Osprey, Pandion haliaetus

Hawks, eagles, and kites

Order: AccipitriformesFamily: Accipitridae

The Accipitridae is a family of birds of prey, which includes hawks, eagles, kites, harriers and Old World vultures. The bearded vulture, dark chanting-goshawk, and tawny eagle are all close to being extirpated in Morocco.

Black-winged kite, Elanus caeruleus
Bearded vulture, Gypaetus barbatus
Egyptian vulture, Neophron percnopterus
European honey-buzzard, Pernis apivorus
Cinereous vulture, Aegypius monachus (A)
Lappet-faced vulture, Torgos tracheliotos 
Hooded vulture, Necrosyrtes monachus (A)
White-backed vulture, Gyps africanus (A)
Rüppell's griffon, Gyps rueppelli (A)
Eurasian griffon, Gyps fulvus
Bateleur, Terathopius ecaudatus (A) 
Short-toed snake-eagle, Circaetus gallicus
Lesser spotted eagle, Clanga pomarina (A)
Greater spotted eagle, Clanga clanga (A)
Booted eagle, Hieraaetus pennatus
Tawny eagle, Aquila rapax
Steppe eagle, Aquila nipalensis (A)
Spanish eagle, Aquila adalberti (A)
Golden eagle, Aquila chrysaetos
Bonelli's eagle, Aquila fasciata
Dark chanting-goshawk, Melierax metabates
Eurasian marsh-harrier, Circus aeruginosus
Hen harrier, Circus cyaneus
Pallid harrier, Circus macrourus (A)
Montagu's harrier, Circus pygargus
Eurasian sparrowhawk, Accipiter nisus
Levant sparrowhawk, Accipiter brevipes (A)
Northern goshawk, Accipiter gentilis
Red kite, Milvus milvus
Black kite, Milvus migrans
White-tailed eagle, Haliaeetus albicilla (A)
Common buzzard, Buteo buteo
Long-legged buzzard, Buteo rufinus

Barn-owls

Order: StrigiformesFamily: Tytonidae

Barn-owls are medium to large owls with large heads and characteristic heart-shaped faces.

Barn owl, Tyto alba

Owls
Order: StrigiformesFamily: Strigidae

The typical owls are small to large solitary nocturnal birds of prey.

Eurasian scops-owl, Otus scops
Eurasian eagle-owl, Bubo bubo (A)
Pharaoh eagle-owl, Bubo ascalaphus
Little owl, Athene noctua
Maghreb owl, Strix mauritanica
Long-eared owl, Asio otus
Short-eared owl, Asio flammeus
African wood owl, Strix woodfordii (A)
Marsh owl, Asio capensis

Hoopoes
Order: BucerotiformesFamily: Upupidae

Hoopoes have black, white, and orangey-pink colouring with a large erectile crest on their head.

Eurasian hoopoe, Upupa epops

Kingfishers
Order: CoraciiformesFamily: Alcedinidae

Kingfishers are medium-sized birds with large heads, long pointed bills, short legs, and stubby tails.

Common kingfisher, Alcedo atthis
Pied kingfisher, Ceryle rudis (A)

Bee-eaters
Order: CoraciiformesFamily: Meropidae

The bee-eaters are a group of near passerine birds in the family Meropidae. Most species are found in Africa but others occur in southern Europe, Madagascar, Australia, and New Guinea. They are characterised by richly coloured plumage, slender bodies, and usually elongated central tail feathers.

White-throated bee-eater, Merops albicollis (A)
Blue-cheeked bee-eater, Merops persicus
European bee-eater, Merops apiaster

Rollers
Order: CoraciiformesFamily: Coraciidae

Rollers resemble crows in size and build, but are more closely related to the kingfishers and bee-eaters.

European roller, Coracias garrulus
Abyssinian roller, Coracias abyssinicus (A)

Woodpeckers
Order: PiciformesFamily: Picidae

Woodpeckers are small to medium-sized birds with chisel-like beaks, short legs, stiff tails, and long tongues.

Eurasian wryneck, Jynx torquilla
Great spotted woodpecker, Dendrocopos major
Middle spotted woodpecker, Dendrocopos medius (A)
Black woodpecker, Dryocopus martius (A) 
Levaillant's woodpecker, Picus vaillantii

Falcons and caracaras
Order: FalconiformesFamily: Falconidae

Falconidae is a family of diurnal birds of prey. They differ from hawks, eagles, and kites in that they kill with their beaks instead of their talons.

Lesser kestrel, Falco naumanni
Eurasian kestrel, Falco tinnunculus
Red-footed falcon, Falco vespertinus (A)
Eleonora's falcon, Falco eleonorae
Sooty falcon, Falco concolor (A)
Merlin, Falco columbarius
Eurasian hobby, Falco subbuteo
Lanner falcon, Falco biarmicus
Saker falcon, Falco cherrug (A)
Peregrine falcon, Falco peregrinus

Old World parrots
Order: PsittaciformesFamily: Psittaculidae

Parrots are small to large birds with a characteristic curved beak shape.

Rose-ringed parakeet, Psittacula krameri (A)

New World and African parrots
Order: PsittaciformesFamily: Psittacidae

Parrots are small to large birds with a characteristic curved beak. Their upper mandibles have slight mobility in the joint with the skull and they have a generally erect stance. All parrots are zygodactyl, having the four toes on each foot placed two at the front and two to the back.

Monk parakeet, Myiopsitta monachus (A)

Vireos
Order: PasseriformesFamily: Vireonidae

The vireos are a group of small to medium-sized passerine birds. They are typically greenish in color and resemble wood warblers apart from their heavier bills.

Red-eyed vireo, Vireo olivaceus (A)

Old World orioles
Order: PasseriformesFamily: Oriolidae

The Old World orioles are colourful passerine birds, not related to the New World orioles.

Eurasian golden oriole, Oriolus oriolus

Bushshrikes and allies
Order: PasseriformesFamily: Malaconotidae

Bushshrikes are similar in habits to shrikes, hunting insects and other small prey from a perch on a bush.

Black-crowned tchagra, Tchagra senegala

Shrikes
Order: PasseriformesFamily: Laniidae

Shrikes are passerine birds known for their habit of catching other birds and small animals and impaling the uneaten portions on thorns.

Red-backed shrike, Lanius collurio (A)
Isabelline shrike, Lanius isabellinus (A)
Iberian gray shrike, Lanius meridionalis
Great gray shrike, Lanius excubitor
Masked shrike, Lanius nubicus (A)
Woodchat shrike, Lanius senator

Crows, jays, and magpies

Order: PasseriformesFamily: Corvidae

The family Corvidae includes crows, ravens, jays, choughs, and magpies. Corvids are above average in size among the Passeriformes, and some of the larger species show high levels of intelligence.

Eurasian jay, Garrulus glandarius
Maghreb magpie, Pica mauritanica
Eurasian magpie, Pica pica
Red-billed chough, Pyrrhocorax pyrrhocorax
Yellow-billed chough, Pyrrhocorax graculus
Eurasian jackdaw, Corvus monedula
House crow, Corvus splendens (A)
Carrion crow, Corvus corone 
Pied crow, Corvus albus (A)
Brown-necked raven, Corvus ruficollis
Common raven, Corvus corax

Tits, chickadees, and titmice
Order: PasseriformesFamily: Paridae

The Paridae are mainly small stocky woodland species with short stout bills.

Coal tit, Periparus ater
Marsh tit, Poecile palustris (A)
Crested tit, Lophophanes cristatus (A)
African blue tit, Cyanistes teneriffae
Great tit, Parus major

Penduline-tits
Order: PasseriformesFamily: Remizidae

The penduline-tits are a group of small passerine birds related to the true tits.

Eurasian penduline-tit, Remiz pendulinus (A)

Larks

Order: PasseriformesFamily: Alaudidae

Larks are small terrestrial birds, mostly fairly dull in appearance.

Greater hoopoe lark, Alaemon alaudipes
Thick-billed lark, Ramphocoris clotbey
Bar-tailed lark, Ammomanes cinctura
Desert lark, Ammomanes deserti
Black-crowned sparrow-lark, Eremopterix nigriceps
Horned lark, Eremophila alpestris
Temminck's lark, Eremophila bilopha
Greater short-toed lark, Calandrella brachydactyla
Calandra lark, Melanocorypha calandra
Dupont's lark, Chersophilus duponti
Dunn's lark, Eremalauda dunni
Mediterranean short-toed lark, Alaudala rufescens
Wood lark, Lullula arborea
Eurasian skylark, Alauda arvensis
Thekla's lark, Galerida theklae
Crested lark, Galerida cristata

Bearded reedling
Order: PasseriformesFamily: Panuridae

The bearded reedling is a small bird found in reed beds across temperate Asia with smaller populations throughout Europe. It is the only member of its family.

Bearded reedling, Panurus biarmicus (A)

Cisticolas and allies
Order: PasseriformesFamily: Cisticolidae

The Cisticolidae are warblers found mainly in warmer regions of the Old World.

Cricket longtail, Spiloptila clamans
Zitting cisticola, Cisticola juncidis

Reed warblers and allies
Order: PasseriformesFamily: Acrocephalidae

The members of this family are usually rather large for "warblers". Most are rather plain olivaceous brown above with much yellow to beige below. They are usually found in open woodland, reedbeds, or tall grass. The family occurs mostly in southern to western Eurasia and surroundings, but it also ranges far into the Pacific, with some species in Africa.

Eastern olivaceous warbler, Iduna pallida 
Western olivaceous warbler, Iduna opaca
Melodious warbler, Hippolais polyglotta
Icterine warbler, Hippolais icterina (A)
Aquatic warbler, Acrocephalus paludicola
Moustached warbler, Acrocephalus melanopogon
Sedge warbler, Acrocephalus schoenobaenus
Marsh warbler, Acrocephalus palustris (A)
Common reed warbler, Acrocephalus scirpaceus
Great reed warbler, Acrocephalus arundinaceus

Grassbirds and allies
Order: PasseriformesFamily: Locustellidae

Locustellidae are a family of small insectivorous songbirds found mainly in Eurasia, Africa, and the Australian region. They are smallish birds with tails that are usually long and pointed, and tend to be drab brownish or buffy all over.

Pallas's grasshopper warbler, Helopsaltes certhiola (A)
River warbler, Locustella fluviatilis (A)
Savi's warbler, Locustella luscinioides
Common grasshopper-warbler, Locustella naevia

Swallows
Order: PasseriformesFamily: Hirundinidae

The family Hirundinidae is a group of passerines adapted to aerial feeding.

Plain martin, Riparia paludicola
Bank swallow, Riparia riparia
Eurasian crag-martin, Ptyonoprogne rupestris
Rock martin, Ptyonoprogne fuligula
Barn swallow, Hirundo rustica
Preuss's swallow, Petrochelidon preussi (A)
Red-rumped swallow, Cecropis daurica
Common house-martin, Delichon urbicum

Bulbuls
Order: PasseriformesFamily: Pycnonotidae

Bulbuls are medium-sized songbirds. Most are drab, with uniform olive-brown to black plumage.

Common bulbul, Pycnonotus barbatus

Leaf warblers
Order: PasseriformesFamily: Phylloscopidae

Leaf warblers are a family of small insectivorous birds found mostly in Eurasia and ranging into Wallacea and Africa. The species are of various sizes, often green-plumaged above and yellow below, or more subdued with greyish-green to greyish-brown colors.

Wood warbler, Phylloscopus sibilatrix
Western Bonelli's warbler, Phylloscopus bonelli
Yellow-browed warbler, Phylloscopus inornatus (A)
Hume's warbler, Phylloscopus humei (A)
Pallas's leaf warbler, Phylloscopus proregulus (A)
Dusky warbler, Phylloscopus fuscatus (A)
Willow warbler, Phylloscopus trochilus
Common chiffchaff, Phylloscopus collybita
Iberian chiffchaff, Phylloscopus ibericus

Bush warblers and allies
Order: PasseriformesFamily: Scotocercidae

The members of this family are found throughout Africa, Asia, and Polynesia.

Scrub warbler, Scotocerca inquieta
Cetti's warbler, Cettia cetti

Long-tailed tits
Order: PasseriformesFamily: Aegithalidae

Long-tailed tits are a group of small passerine birds with medium to long tails.

Long-tailed tit, Aegithalos caudatus (A)

Sylviid warblers, parrotbills, and allies
Order: PasseriformesFamily: Sylviidae

The family Sylviidae is a group of small insectivorous passerine birds. They mainly occur as breeding species, as the common name implies, in Europe, Asia, and, to a lesser extent, Africa. Most are of generally undistinguished appearance, but many have distinctive songs.

Eurasian blackcap, Sylvia atricapilla
Garden warbler, Sylvia borin
Lesser whitethroat, Curruca curruca
Western Orphean warbler, Curruca hortensis
African desert warbler, Curruca deserti
Tristram's warbler, Curruca deserticola
Sardinian warbler, Curruca melanocephala
Moltoni's warbler, Curruca subalpina (A) 
Western subalpine warbler, Curruca iberiae
Eastern subalpine warbler, Curruca cantillans (A) 
Greater whitethroat, Curruca communis
Spectacled warbler, Curruca conspicillata
Marmora's warbler, Curruca sarda (A)
Dartford warbler, Curruca undata

Laughingthrushes and allies
Order: PasseriformesFamily: Leiothrichidae

The members of this family are diverse in size and colouration, though those of genus Turdoides tend to be brown or greyish. The family is found in Africa, India, and southeast Asia.

Fulvous chatterer, Argya fulva

Kinglets
Order: PasseriformesFamily: Regulidae

The kinglets and "crests" are a small family of birds which resemble some warblers. The adults have colored crowns, giving rise to their name.

Goldcrest, Regulus regulus (A)
Common firecrest, Regulus ignicapillus

Wallcreeper
Order: PasseriformesFamily: Tichodromidae

The wallcreeper is a small bird, with crimson, grey, and black plumage, related to the nuthatches.

Wallcreeper, Tichodroma muraria (A)

Nuthatches
Order: PasseriformesFamily: Sittidae

Nuthatches are small woodland birds.

Eurasian nuthatch, Sitta europaea

Treecreepers
Order: PasseriformesFamily: Certhiidae

Treecreepers are small woodland birds, brown above and white below.

Short-toed treecreeper, Certhia brachydactyla

Wrens
Order: PasseriformesFamily: Troglodytidae

The wrens have short wings and thin down-turned bills.

Eurasian wren, Troglodytes troglodytes

Dippers
Order: PasseriformesFamily: Cinclidae

Dippers are a group of perching birds which specialise in feeding in running water.

White-throated dipper, Cinclus cinclus

Starlings
Order: PasseriformesFamily: Sturnidae

Starlings are small to medium-sized passerine birds.

European starling, Sturnus vulgaris
Spotless starling, Sturnus unicolor
Rosy starling, Pastor roseus (A)

Thrushes and allies
Order: PasseriformesFamily: Turdidae

The thrushes are a group of passerine birds that occur mainly but not exclusively in the Old World. They are plump, soft plumaged, small to medium-sized insectivores or sometimes omnivores, often feeding on the ground. Many have attractive songs.

Mistle thrush, Turdus viscivorus
Song thrush, Turdus philomelos
Redwing, Turdus iliacus
Eurasian blackbird, Turdus merula
Eyebrowed thrush, Turdus obscurus (A)
African thrush, Turdus pelios (A)
Fieldfare, Turdus pilaris (A)
Ring ouzel, Turdus torquatus

Old World flycatchers
Order: PasseriformesFamily: Muscicapidae

Old World flycatchers are a large group of small passerine birds native to the Old World. They are mainly small arboreal insectivores. The appearance of these birds is highly varied, but they mostly have weak songs and harsh calls.

Spotted flycatcher, Muscicapa striata
Rufous-tailed scrub-robin, Cercotrichas galactotes
European robin, Erithacus rubecula
Common nightingale, Luscinia megarhynchos
Bluethroat, Luscinia svecica
Red-breasted flycatcher, Ficedula parva (A)
European pied flycatcher, Ficedula hypoleuca (A)
Semi-collared flycatcher, Ficedula semitorquata (A)
Atlas flycatcher, Ficedula speculigera
Collared flycatcher, Ficedula albicollis (A)
Moussier's redstart, Phoenicurus moussieri
Common redstart, Phoenicurus phoenicurus
Black redstart, Phoenicurus ochruros
Rufous-tailed rock-thrush, Monticola saxatilis
Blue rock-thrush, Monticola solitarius
Whinchat, Saxicola rubetra
European stonechat, Saxicola rubicola
Northern wheatear, Oenanthe oenanthe
Atlas wheatear, Oenanthe seebohmi
Isabelline wheatear, Oenanthe isabellina
Desert wheatear, Oenanthe deserti
Western black-eared wheatear, Oenanthe hispanica
Eastern black-eared wheatear, Oenanthe melanoleuca (A)
Red-rumped wheatear, Oenanthe moesta
Black wheatear, Oenanthe leucura
White-crowned wheatear, Oenanthe leucopyga
Mourning wheatear, Oenanthe halophila

Waxbills and allies

Order: PasseriformesFamily: Estrildidae

The estrildid finches are small passerine birds of the Old World tropics and Australasia. They are gregarious and often colonial seed eaters with short thick but pointed bills. They are all similar in structure and habits, but have wide variation in plumage colours and patterns.

Red-billed firefinch, Lagonosticta senegala (A)

Accentors
Order: PasseriformesFamily: Prunellidae

The accentors are in the only bird family which is completely endemic to the Palearctic.

Alpine accentor, Prunella collaris
Dunnock, Prunella modularis

Old World sparrows
Order: PasseriformesFamily: Passeridae

In general, sparrows tend to be small, plump, brown or grey birds with short tails and short powerful beaks. Sparrows are seed eaters, but they also consume small insects.

House sparrow, Passer domesticus
Spanish sparrow, Passer hispaniolensis
Desert sparrow, Passer simplex
Eurasian tree sparrow, Passer montanus
Sudan golden sparrow, Passer luteus (A)
Rock sparrow, Petronia petronia
White-winged snowfinch, Montifringilla nivalis (A)

Wagtails and pipits
Order: PasseriformesFamily: Motacillidae

The Motacillidae is a family of small passerine birds with medium to long tails. They are slender ground-feeding insectivores of open country.

Gray wagtail, Motacilla cinerea
Western yellow wagtail, Motacilla flava
Citrine wagtail, Motacilla citreola (A)
White wagtail, Motacilla alba
Richard's pipit, Anthus richardi (A)
Tawny pipit, Anthus campestris
Meadow pipit, Anthus pratensis
Tree pipit, Anthus trivialis
Olive-backed pipit, Anthus hodgsoni (A)
Red-throated pipit, Anthus cervinus
Plain-backed pipit, Anthus leucophrys (A)
Water pipit, Anthus spinoletta
Rock pipit, Anthus petrosus (A)
American pipit, Anthus rubescens (A)

Finches, euphonias, and allies
Order: PasseriformesFamily: Fringillidae

Finches are seed-eating passerine birds that are small to moderately large and have a strong beak, usually conical and in some species very large. These birds have a bouncing flight with alternating bouts of flapping and gliding on closed wings, and most sing well.

Common chaffinch, Fringilla coelebs
Brambling, Fringilla montifringilla
Hawfinch, Coccothraustes coccothraustes
Common rosefinch, Carpodacus erythrinus (A)
Eurasian bullfinch, Pyrrhula pyrrhula (A)
Crimson-winged finch, Rhodopechys sanguineus
Trumpeter finch, Bucanetes githaginea
European greenfinch, Chloris chloris
Eurasian linnet, Linaria cannabina
Common redpoll, Acanthis flammea (A)
Lesser redpoll, Acanthis cabaret (A)
Red crossbill, Loxia curvirostra
European goldfinch, Carduelis carduelis
Citril finch, Carduelis citrinella (A)
Island canary, Serinus canaria (A)
European serin, Serinus serinus
Eurasian siskin, Spinus spinus

Snow buntings and longspurs
Order: PasseriformesFamily: Calcariidae

The Calcariidae are a group of passerine birds that had been traditionally grouped with the New World sparrows, but differ in a number of respects and are usually found in open grassy areas.

Snow bunting, Plectrophenax nivalis (A)
Lapland longspur, Calcarius lapponicus (A)

Old World buntings
Order: PasseriformesFamily: Emberizidae

Emberizidae are a large family of passerine birds. They are seed-eating birds with distinctively shaped bills. Many emberizid species have distinctive head patterns.

Black-headed bunting, Emberiza melanocephala (A)
Corn bunting, Emberiza calandra
Rock bunting, Emberiza cia
Cirl bunting, Emberiza cirlus
Yellowhammer, Emberiza citrinella (A)
Ortolan bunting, Emberiza hortulana
House bunting, Emberiza sahari
Reed bunting, Emberiza schoeniclus
Little bunting, Emberiza pusilla (A)

See also
List of birds
Lists of birds by region

References

External links
Moroccan birds blog
Birds reported during tours in Morocco, with links to photos

Morocco
Birds
 
Birds
Morocco